Champion of Champions may refer to:

Champion of Champions (horse race), a stakes race annually held in California
Champion of Champions (snooker), a professional snooker tournament
Champions of Champions Elite, a martial arts television show focused on Muay Thai
L'Équipe Champion of Champions, a sporting achievement/personality award presented by the French daily publication L'Équipe
Orvin – Champion Of Champions, a 2003 musical play by Alan Ayckbourn
The Champion of Champions, a 1972 film directed by Chia Li

See also 
 Campeón de Campeones, a defunct annual Mexican association football competition
 Race of Champions, an international motorsport event